This is a list of Native Pro-Axis Leaders and Governments or Direct Control in Occupied Territories, including:
 territories with some indigenous pro-Axis leaders
 collaborating local administrations
 direct administration by occupying pro-Axis forces

 Albania (until 1945)
 Bohemia and Moravia (until 1945)
 Carpatho-Ruthenia (until 1944)
 Belgium (until 1944)
 Banat  (until 1944)
 Backa  (until 1944)
 Bosnia (until 1944-45)
 Herzegovina (until 1944-45)
 Dalmatia (until 1945)
 Slovenia (Carniola) (until 1945)
 Littoral (Küstenland) (until 1945)
 Sanjak of Novi Pazar (until 1944)
 Transylvania (Siebenburgen) (until 1944)
 Kosovo (until 1944)
 Macedonia (until 1944)
 Montenegro (until 1944)
 Serbia (until 1944)
 Croatia (until 1945)
 Slavonia (until 1944)
 Galicia (until 1944)
 Dobruja (until 1944)
 Bukovina (until 1944)
 Bessarabia (until 1944)
 Transnistria (until 1944)
 Moldavia (until 1944)
 Netherlands (until 1944)
 Luxembourg  (until 1944)
 France (German held area of France) (until 1944)
 Channel Islands (German held area of British Isles) (until 1945)
 Greece (until 1944)
 Denmark  (until 1945)
 Dodecanese (until 1943)
 Norway   (until 1945)
 Estonia  (until 1944)
 Latvia   (until 1944)
 Lithuania (until 1944)
 Ukraine (until 1944)
 Belarus (until 1944)
 Russia  (Occupied areas) (until 1944)
 Caucasia (north areas) (until 1943)
 General Government (German administration over occupied Polish areas) (until 1945)
 Syria (until 1941)
 Lebanon (until 1941)
 Morocco (until 1943)
 Algeria (until 1943)
 Tunisia (until 1943)
 Libya (until 1943)
 Ethiopia (until 1941)
 Somalia (until 1941)
 Djibouti (until 1942)
 Madagascar (until 1942)
 Hong Kong (Kowloon) (Japanese held British Land) (until 1945)
 Macau (Japanese Held Portuguese Land) (until 1945)
 Philippines (until 1945)
 Burma (until 1945)
 Malaya (Malacca) (until 1945)
 Singapore (Syonan) (until 1945)
 Brunei (until 1945)
 Dutch East Indies (Indonesia)(until 1945)
 Christmas Island (Japanese Held British Land) (until 1945)
 East Timor (Japanese Held Portuguese Land) (until 1945)
 New Guinea (Japanese Held Australian Land) (until 1945)
 Andaman & Nicobar Islands (Japanese Held British Land) (until 1945)
 Attu (Japanese Held American Land) (until 1943)
 Kiska (Japanese Held American Land) (until 1943)
 Solomon Islands (until 1943)
 Gilbert Islands (until 1944)
 Guam (until 1944)
 Wake Island (until 1945)
 Nauru (until 1945)

See also 
 Military occupation
 Quisling
 Collaboration

Politics of World War II
Axis powers